Huliya Haalina Mevu is a 1979 Indian Kannada-language epic historical drama film directed by Vijay, based on a novel of the same name by Bharathisutha  starring Rajkumar as Chengumani, the commander-in-chief of the 18th-century Kingdom of Coorg. Jayachitra and Jayapradha feature in pivotal roles. The movie was dubbed in Telugu as Prachanda Bheri. This was also Rajkumar's first cinemascope movie.

Plot
Chengumani, a tiger hunter becomes the king's commander-in-chief after saving his life, but his life gets complicated when he falls in love with Poovi and marries her.

Cast

Soundtrack 

The music was composed by G. K. Venkatesh, with lyrics penned by Chi. Udaya Shankar.

Tracks

Trivia
The movie was 7th of the nine movies (excluding cameo appearances in Shiva Mecchida Kannappa and Gandhada Gudi Part 2 )from Dr. Rajkumar - director Vijay duo and the duo's second movie made on the backdrop of royal family after the 1975 classic Mayura. 
The movie has the protagonist enacted by Dr. Rajkumar dying in the climax which is said to have caused a massive outrage among his fans. However, the climax was not changed.
 The makers had announced that the movie collected ₹40.50 lakhs within 3 weeks of its release.

References

External links 
 
 Songs

1979 films
1970s Kannada-language films
Indian drama films
Films based on Indian novels
Films scored by G. K. Venkatesh
Films with screenplays by Chi. Udayashankar
Films directed by Vijay (director)